The Ungrateful Dead is the 2013 season 3 premiere of the TV show Grimm, 45th overall TV episode

Ungrateful Dead may also refer to:

 Ungrateful Dead (play), a 1993 stage play by Parv Bancil
 Ungrateful Dead (story), a 2008 short story by Kelley Armstrong set in Otherworld; see Women of the Otherworld

See also

 Grateful dead (disambiguation)
 Ungrateful (disambiguation)
 Dead (disambiguation)